The Canton of Argelès-sur-Mer is a French former canton of Pyrénées-Orientales department, in Languedoc-Roussillon. It had 26,876 inhabitants (2012). It was disbanded following the French canton reorganisation which came into effect in March 2015.

Composition
The canton of Argelès-sur-Mer consisted of 8 communes:

References 

Argeles-sur-Mer
2015 disestablishments in France
States and territories disestablished in 2015